Asadabad may refer to:

Afghanistan
 Asadabad, Afghanistan, capital of Kunar Province
 Asadabad District, district of Kunar Province, Afghanistan

Azerbaijan
 Asadabad, Jalilabad, Azerbaijan
 Əsədabad, Azerbaijan

Iran

Ardabil Province
 Asadabad, Ardabil, a village in Meshgin Shahr County

Chaharmahal and Bakhtiari Province
 Asadabad, Chaharmahal and Bakhtiari, a village in Shahrekord County

Fars Province
 Asadabad, Kazerun, a village in Kazerun County
 Asadabad-e Lateh Kuh, a village in Kazerun County
 Asadabad, Sepidan, a village in Sepidan County

Hamadan Province
 Asadabad, Iran, a city in Hamadan Province
 Asadabad, Nahavand, a village in Nahavand County
 Asadabad County

Ilam Province
 Asadabad-e Sofla, Ilam, a village in Darreh Shahr County
 Asadabad-e Vosta, Ilam, a village in Darreh Shahr County

Isfahan Province
 Asadabad, Isfahan, a village in Isfahan County
 Asadabad-e Bala, Isfahan, a village in Kashan County
 Asadabad, Mobarakeh, a village in Mobarakeh County
 Asadabad, Nain, a village in Nain County
 Asadabad, Semirom, a village in Semirom County

Kerman Province
 Asadabad, Anar, a village in Anar County
 Asadabad-e Rahnama, a village in Anar County
 Asadabad-e Anguri, a village in Fahraj County
 Asadabad, Narmashir, a village in Narmashir County
 Asadabad, Rafsanjan, a village in Rafsanjan County

Kermanshah Province
 Asadabad, Kermanshah, a village in Kermanshah County
 Asadabad, Sahneh, a village in Sahneh County

Khuzestan Province
 Asadabad, Khuzestan, a village in Behbahan County
 Asadabad, Andika, a village in Andika County

Kurdistan Province
 Asadabad, Kurdistan, a village in Kamyaran County

Lorestan Province
 Asadabad, Firuzabad, a village in Lorestan Province
 Asadabad, Rumeshkhan, a village in Lorestan Province
 Asadabad, Selseleh, a village in Lorestan Province
 Asadabad, Tarhan, a village in Lorestan Province
 Asadabad-e Chenar, a village in Lorestan Province
 Asadabad-e Olya, Selseleh, a village in Lorestan Province
 Asadabad-e Sofla, Lorestan, a village in Lorestan Province
 Asadabad-e Vosta, Delfan, a village in Lorestan Province
 Asadabad-e Vosta, Selseleh, a village in Lorestan Province

Markazi Province
 Asadabad, Khomeyn, a village in Khomeyn County
 Asadabad, Khondab, a village in Khondab County
 Asadabad, Mahallat, a village in Mahallat County

Mazandaran Province
 Asadabad, Savadkuh, a village in Savadkuh County
 Asadabad, Tonekabon, a village in Tonekabon County

Qazvin Province
 Asadabad, Qazvin, a village in Qazvin Province
 Asadabad-e Khurin, a village in Qazvin Province

Razavi Khorasan Province
 Asadabad, Kalat, a village in Kalat County
 Asadabad, Khvaf, a village in Khvaf County
 Asadabad, Sarakhs, a village in Sarakhs County
 Asadabad-e Darband, a village in Taybad County
 Asadabad, Jolgeh Rokh, a village in Torbat-e Heydarieh County

Semnan Province
 Asadabad, Semnan, a village in Semnan County

South Khorasan Province
 Asadabad, South Khorasan, a village in Nehbandan County
 Asadabad, Shusef, a village in Nehbandan County
 Asadabad-e Arab, a village in Nehbandan County

Tehran Province
 Asadabad, Varamin, a village in Varamin County

Yazd Province
 Asadabad, Yazd, a village in Abarkuh County
 Asadabad-e Bala, Yazd, a village in Abarkuh County
 Asadabad-e Pain, a village in Abarkuh County

Zanjan Province
 Asadabad, Abhar, a village in Abhar County
 Asadabad, Soltaniyeh, a village in Abhar County